Novosibirsk Thermal Power Plant 5 is a coal-fired power plant located in the Oktyabrsky City District of Novosibirsk. It is one of the largest thermal power stations in Russia and started operating in 1977.

History
The decision to build the power plant was taken in 1971 and it officially started operating on 28 March 1977.

References

External links
 Анатолий Локоть проинспектировал работу новосибирской ТЭЦ-5. Континент Сибирь.

Oktyabrsky District, Novosibirsk
Economy of Novosibirsk
Coal-fired power stations in Russia